HIT: The First Case is a 2022 Indian Hindi-language action suspense-thriller film written and directed by Sailesh Kolanu, being a remake of his 2020 Telugu film of the same name. The film is produced by Dil Raju Production and T-Series. It stars Rajkummar Rao and Sanya Malhotra. It was released on 15 July 2022.

Plot

Vikram Jaisingh aka Vicky is a cop who works in the Homicide Intervention Team HIT, and is sharp person, who solves crucial cases with his ability to capture even the smallest of details, thus earning the trust of his senior Ajit. He is in love with Neha Mehta, his colleague and a forensic official.

Rohit is Vikram's close friend and his colleague, who accompanies him in most of his cases. Vikram is constantly in an argument with Akshay, another officer, who crosses lines with Vikram. Vikram occasionally suffers from PTSD due to his past experience and refuses to take pills as he believes it slows down his abilities.

Meanwhile, a girl named Preeti is driving on the highway, and her car stops to the side because it suffers a malfunction. Officer Ibrahim Sheikh, stops to help her, and she calls her father since she forgot her phone at her home. When her father comes to pick her up, he sees that she has gone missing and Ibrahim says that she got into a blue car and he thought it was his car.

When Preeti's parents approach Ibrahim demandingly, he remains firm and insults them. Being a good friend of Preeti’ parents, Ajit decides to suspend Ibrahim because of how he acted and since he does not believe him. Vikram decides to take a six-month break to relieve his PTSD attacks. After two months, Vikram gets a call that Neha goes missing. He decides to go back to Ajit and ask for the case file for Neha going missing, but he says Akshay is dealing with the case, and he cannot give it to him.

Vikram decides to ask Saxena, who is Neha's colleague, about the cases Neha has dealt with the past two months. Vikram and Rohit connect Preeti's and Neha's missing case and deduce that the same person is involved in both cases. Vikram decides to investigate, and he asks Srinivas for Preethi's case, and he takes over the case.

Meanwhile, Akshay has suspicions that Vikram was the one who kidnapped Neha. Vikram decides to go to Preeti's college, and he asks Ajay and Sandya about what happened the previous night, and they say the same response how they were at a pub. Vikram and Rohit ask both Preeti's parents, and they say that her parents died in a plane crash and she was living with them and Preeti's neighbor Sheela about her.

Vikram and Rohit start deducing the case, and they come to a conclusion that Sheela kidnapped Preeti after they see Sheela's blue car and a note forged by Sheela indicating the whereabouts of Preeti's corpse. Ibrahim then sees the car and says that Sheela was not the one who kidnapped Preeti. Vikram and his team dig up the body behind the house and find that it is unnoticeable and it has a few DNA samples on it.

Vikram suspects Ajay because he said that Preeti was his girlfriend. While searching for the evidences Vikram gets a call from a stranger named Eesha who is stalked by a man in a car telling her to stop so that he can talk, but she drives fast and reaches the outskirts and contacted Vikram. Vikram begins his investigation in the toll booth in the highway. Vikram using the toll gate security cameras he deduces that the man who kidnapped was Fahad. After Vikram, Akshay, and Ibrahim find Fahad, Ibrahim is shot dead by Fahad while Vikram and Akshay capture him. Fahad takes them to the house where he received the money to kidnap Preeti. Vikram finds out that it was Rohit's house, and before Rohit shoots him, he shoots him dead.

Akshay goes upstairs and gets Neha. During the funeral of Rohit Sapna explains how Preeti and Sapna belonged to the same orphanage. Sapna had started developing feelings for Preeti since the age of 14. Saraswati Ma'am from the orphanage had tried to separate them. A couple came to adopt a child and were interested in both of them. But in the end they choose one and Preeti gets selected and adopted. Saraswati Ma'am asked her to suppress her feelings.

Sapna explains how she saw Preeti at a club and suddenly all the pent up feelings came out. Sapna tries to tell Preeti but Preeti rebukes Sapna. To express her feelings to Preeti, Sapna kidnaps Preeti with the help of Fahad and then Preeti dies in a scuffle. Rohit tries to protect Sapna by burying  her and planting the DNA evidences. Sapna explains the whole story and Sapna gets arrested. Vikram attends the funeral of Both Preeti and Ibrahim. the Unidentified DNA on Preeti was of Rohit . He knew he would be caught and wanted to die at the hands of Vikram.

When Neha and Vikram are talking, Vikram almost gets shot, hinting at a sequel.

Cast
 Rajkummar Rao as Inspector Vikram Jaisingh (Vicky), Neha's love interest 
 Sanya Malhotra as Dr. Neha Mehta, Vikram's love interest
 Akhil Iyer as Rohit Shukla, Vikram's colleague
 Shilpa Shukla as Sheela
 Dalip Tahil as Ajit Singh Shekhawat, Vikram's senior officer
 Sanjay Narvekar as Shrikant Saxena 
 Milind Gunaji as SI Ibrahim Sheikh
 Jatin Goswami as Akshay 
 Rose Khan as Preeti Mathur
 Raviraj as Fahaad
 Madhur Arora as Anirudh
 Dishita Sehgal as Young Preeti
 Nuveksha as Sapna Shukla, Rohit's wife & Preeti's obsessed lover 
 Kirti Kapoor as Geetha
 Karan Mehta as Shiva
 Noyrika Bhatheja as Dr Ritika

Production 
Principal photography commenced on 12 September 2021 and wrapped up on 18 April 2022.

Soundtrack

The music of the film is composed by Mithoon and Manan Bhardwaj while the lyrics are written by Sayeed Quadri and Manan Bhardwaj. The film score is composed by John Stewart Eduri. The first single was released on 29 June 2022.

Reception

Box office 
HIT: The First Case earned 1.35 crore at the domestic box office on its opening day and 5.59 crore on opening weekend.

Critical response
HIT: The First Case received mixed to positive reviews from critics with praise towards the performance of Rao and Malhotra, pacing and direction. Chirag Sehgal of News 18 rated the film 3.5 out of 5 stars and wrote "Rajkummar Rao shines bright in the movie. The film also looks very similar to Kunal Kemmu's web series Abhay". A critic for Bollywood Hungama rated the film 3 out of 5 stars and wrote "HIT THE FIRST CASE is a decent watch thanks to a superlative performance, whodunit element and a story". Shubham Kulkarni of Koimoi rated the film 3 out of 5 stars and wrote "Rajkummar Rao needs his glory back where the entire movie somehow complimented his talent and hardwork. This is not it but is not entirely bad either". Tushar Joshi of India Today rated the film 3 out of 5 stars and wrote "If you are looking for a solid performance from Rajkummar Rao, then HIT won't disappoint. It is gripping in parts but we hoped the writers had put in more efforts to go beyond just remaking another south film". Renuka Vyavahare of The Times of India rated the film 3 out of 5 stars and wrote "Rajkummar Rao lends gravitas to the dawdling crime mystery. He has the ability to elevate a scrambled script and he does that here as well. He ensures you are on his team despite the misfires. HIT is more of a hit-and-miss"  Sukanya Verma of Rediff.com rated the film 3 out of 5 stars and wrote "HIT: The First Case hits the jackpot with Rajkummar Rao.
Nothing escapes his discerning eye. Nothing comes in our way of admiring it". Devesh Sharma of Filmfare rated the film 3 out of 5 stars and wrote "Rajkumar Rao is the best thing about the film and keeps you invested in the project through sheer dint of effort". A critic for Pinkvilla rated the film 3 out of 5 stars and wrote "HIT: The First Case hits the bulls eye in the first half, but falls flat in the second. It's an honest attempt to bring the thriller for the Hindi audience".

Home media 
The film started streaming on Netflix from 28 August 2022.

References

External links
 
 

2022 films
2022 LGBT-related films
Indian action thriller films
Indian thriller drama films
Indian mystery thriller films
Indian LGBT-related films
2020s Hindi-language films
2022 action thriller films
2022 thriller drama films
2020s mystery thriller films
Films about missing people
Hindi remakes of Telugu films
Lesbian-related films
Films directed by Sailesh Kolanu